Vishna Pass (‘Prohod Vishna’ \'pro-hod 'vi-shna\) is the ice-covered saddle of elevation 632 m separating Poibrene Heights from Forbidden Plateau on Oscar II Coast, Graham Land in Antarctica.  It is part of the glacial divide between Evans Glacier to the north and Punchbowl Glacier to the south.

The feature is named after the settlement of Vishna in eastern Bulgaria.

Location
British mapping in 1974.

Maps
 Antarctic Digital Database (ADD). Scale 1:250000 topographic map of Antarctica. Scientific Committee on Antarctic Research (SCAR), 1993–2016.

Notes

References
 Bulgarian Antarctic Gazetteer. Antarctic Place-names Commission. (details in Bulgarian, basic data in English)

External links
 Vishna Pass. Copernix satellite image

Mountain passes of Graham Land
Oscar II Coast
Bulgaria and the Antarctic